This is a list of mayors of the city of Markham, Ontario as well as reeves of Markham Village and Township of Markham

York County Era (1850-1971)
Following the passage of the Baldwin Act in 1849 (now Municipal Incorporation Act) the Home District was abolished and local governments were created. The Village of Markham (a police village called Markham Village) was formed in 1850 (with York County, Ontario) and a local council led by a reeve.

From 1850 to 1873 the reeve was appointed position. On November 20, 1872, the Warden of York County signed the By-law of Incorporation, which resulted in the election of the reeve (and Council) for the Village of Markham.

 1. Amos Wright 1850
 2. David Reesor 1851
 3. George P Dickson 1852
 4. Henry Miller 1853-1855
 5. David Reesor 1856-57
 6. William Marr Button 1858 - Lieutenant Colonel of the 1st York Light Dragoons (now The Governor General's Horse Guards) and grandson of Captain John Button, founder of the 1st York Light Dragoons (Button's Troop)
 7. David Reesor 1859-1860
 8. William Marr Button 1861-1863
 9. John Bowman 1864-1865
 10. William Marr Button 1866
 11. John Bowman 1867
 12. William Marr Button 1868-1873 - last unelected reeve of the village of Markham before 1873
 13. James Robinson 1874-1878 - first elected reeve of the village
 14. William Eakin 1879-1882
 15. Thomas Williamson 1883
 16. David James 1884-1886
 17. Robert Bruce 1887-1888
 18. Anthony Forster 1889-1892
 19. Jonathan Slater 1893-1896
 20. Walter Scott 1897-1898
 21. James Laurie 1899
 22. Arthur Quantz 1900
 23. James Dimma 1901-1902
 24. Abner Summerfeldt 1903-1904
 25. Jonathan Slater 1905-1907
 26. William Henry Lapp 1908–1909
 27. Jonathan Nigh 1910-1916
 28. George P. Padget 1917-1923
 29. Wesley Gohn 1924-1932
 30. George P. Padget 1933-1936
 31. Orville Heisey 1938-1943
 32. Charles H. Hooper 1944-1947
 33. William W. Griffin 1948-1949
 34. Winfred Timbers 1950-1953
 35. Alfred DeMasurier 1954-1956
 36. William L. Clark 1957-1960
 37. Alma Walker 1961-1967 - last reeve of the Village of Markham and first female reeve of the village

After 1968, Markham Village became the Township of Markham with council now led by a mayor:

 38. Alma Walker 1968-1970 - Mayor - first mayor and first female mayor

Reeves of Markham Village 1872-1968

 James Spleight 1872-1882
 Garnet R. Vanzant 1883-1884, 1888, 1890
 James Robinson 1885-1887
 William Hamilton Hall 1889, 1891-1892
 John Jerman 1893-1894
 Fred C. Ash 1895
 Dr Wesley Robinson 1896
 Thomas H. Spleight 1897, 1906-1910
 Fred Underhill 1898-1899
 R.C. Tefft 1900, 1911-1912
 Edward H. Wilson 1901
 Henry C. Marr 1902, 1904
 E.H. Wilson 1903, 1905
 Robert A. Fleming 1913-1919
 Dr T. H. Hassard 1920
 Fred Gowland 1921-1922
 Arthur Ferrier Wilson 1923-1925, 1930
 George W. Wilson 1926-1929
 Frank Nighswander 1932-1933
 Albert Wideman 1933-1937
 Orville B. Heisey 1938-1943 - Proprietor - Unionville Planing Mill
 Frank A. Burkholder 1944-1946
 Charles W. Reesor 1947-1949
 Edward Reeve 1950-1951
 Joseph V Fry 1952-1961
 Alma Walker 1962-1968

Mayors of Markham Village 1969-1970
 Alma Walker 1969-1970

York Region Era (1971-)

Post war changes and the rapid urban growth of Toronto led to the shrinking of York County and gave rise to the establishment of the Regional Municipality of York (Regional Municipality of York Act RSO).  Following the creation of York Region in 1971, the Town of Markham was incorporated by the larger Township of Markham Village, annexing the smaller villages of Unionville, Ontario and Thornhill, Ontario (portion east of Yonge Street) into the new local government. A new Town Council was created (replacing the councils of Markham Village, Unionville and Thornhill) and led by the following mayors:

 39. Anthony Roman 1970-1984 - last Mayor of the Township and first Mayor of the Town of Markham
 40. Carole Bell 1984-1988
 41. Anthony Roman 1988-1992
 42. Frank Scarpitti 1992-1994 - appointed following the death of Roman
 43. Don Cousens 1994-2006
 44. Frank Scarpitti 2006–present - last town mayor and first city mayor

Deputy Mayors and Reeves
 David Reesor 1850
 Henry Miller 1851
 Alexander Hunter 1852
 John Reesor 1853-1854
 George Pringle 1856-1857
 William Trudgeon 1858
 Robert Marsh 1859, 1861
 William Button 1860
 Archibald Barker 1862
 John Bowman 1863
 James Gormley 1864-1865
 James Robinson 1866
 James Bowman 1867
 John Lane 1868-1875
 William Milliken 1876 - Postmaster - Milliken Postal Village
 Benjamin F. Reesor 1878-1881
 David James 1882-1883
 Robert Bruce 1884-1886
 Anthony Forster 1887-1888
 H.B. Schmidt 1889-1891
 Jonathan Slater 1892
 Walter Scott 1893-1896
 James Lawrie 1897
 Arthur Quantz 1898-1899
 James Dimma 1900
 John Eckardt 1901
 Abner Summerfeldt 1902, 1917
 George Morrison 1903-1905
 W.H. Lapp 1906–1907
 Jonathan Nigh 1908-1909
 George B. Padget 1910-1916
 John A. Mitchell 1918-1921
 Wesley V. Gohn 1922-1923
 Robert A. Smith 1924, 1931-1933
 John R. Campbell 1925-1927
 Reuben L. Stiver 1928-1930
 William L. Clark 1934, 1944-1945, 1954-1956
 James Rennie 1935-1936
 Charles H. Hooper 1937-1943, 1963
 Albert Reesor 1946
 Dalton Rummey 1947-1948, 1950-1951
 Winfred Timbers 1949
 Alfred E. James 1952
 Alfred LeMasurier 1953
 Donald M. Deacon 1957
 Wilfred R. Dean 1958-1960
 I. Lawson Mumberson 1961-1962
 Stewart T. Rumble 1964-1965
 S.J. Gadsby 1967-1968
 Anthony Roman 1969-1970
 Thomas Williamson - was a township councillor and later reeve 
 Ron Dancey - later served as Councillor in Brant, Ontario
 Ronald Moran 1980s-1991 - served as Regional Councillor for Markham
 Frank Scarpitti 1991-1992
 Carole Bell 1994-1996
 Frank Scarpitti 1997–2006
 Jim Jones 2006-2007
 Jack Heath 2007–2018
 Don Hamilton 2018-present

Notable reeves and mayors

Several reeves and mayors of Markham went on to serve in higher elected office after (and before) their terms in Markham:

 Reesor served as a legislative councillor in the Legislative Council of the Province of Canada and later in the Senate of Canada.
 Wright served as a MLA in the Legislative Assembly of the Province of Canada, MP in the House of Commons of Canada, as well as federal Indian Agent and Crown Agent of Ontario.
 Roman served as Chair of York Region Council and was an MP in the House of Commons of Canada before becoming mayor.
 Cousens served a provincial cabinet minister and MPP in the Legislative Assembly of Ontario before becoming mayor.
 Eakin served as Warden of York County, Ontario, later becoming a MLA and Speaker of the Legislative Assembly of the Northwest Territories.

See also

 Home District Council for details on the Home District Council Chairman, who was the highest elected official for all of the District.
 Markham City Council

References

External links
 

 
Markham